The 74st (1st Hannover) Infantry Regiment, or , was an infantry regiment of the Prussian Army (1866 to 1871) and the German Imperial Army (1871 to 1918).

Legacy 
 The 74th fought in the Franco-Prussian War and distinguished itself during the Battle of Spicheren. Later it served in World War I.

After the war, when the German Imperial Army was dissolved, the regiment was perpetuated in the Reichswehr by 6. Kompanie/16. Infanterie-Regiment (6. Division, based in Münster).

The  published a regimental history in 1931.

See also
List of Imperial German infantry regiments

References

Bibliography 
 Funck, Hans. Offizier-Stammliste des vormaligen Königlich Hannoverschen 3. Infanterie-Regiments und des 1. Hannoverschen Infanterie-Regiments Nr. 74. Hannover: Rechts-, Staats- und Sozialwiss. Verl., 1913.
 Funck, Hans. Offizier-Stammliste des vormaligen Königlich Hannoverschen 3. Infanterie-Regiments und des 1. Hannoverschen Infanterie-Regiments Nr. 74. Hannover: Rechts-, Staats- und Sozialwiss. Verl., 1936. (Erg. 2)
 Gabriel, Kurt. Das 1. Hannoversche Infanterie-Regiment Nr 74 im Weltkriege. Hannover: Beeck, 1931.
 Zur Nedden, August. Geschichte des I. Hannoverschen Infanterie-Regiments Nr 74 und des vormaligen Königlich Hannoverschen 3. Infanterie-Regiments : 1813 bis 1903. Berlin: Mittler, 1903.

Infantry regiments of the Prussian Army
Military units and formations established in 1866
Military units and formations disestablished in 1871
Military units and formations established in 1871
Military units and formations disestablished in 1918
1866 establishments in Prussia